The 2011 Armenian Premier League  football season was the twentieth since its establishment. The season began in March 2011 and  ended in November 2011. FC Pyunik were the defending champions, having won their thirteenth championship last season, their tenth in a row.

Teams
Despite the fact that Shirak finished last season in eighth and last place, it was decided that they should remain in the top flight for another season. However, Kilikia decided not to participate in this year's Armenian Premier League competition, citing financial difficulties as a reason.

Kilikia FC was replaced by 2010 Armenian First League champions Ararat Yerevan.

 1Impuls played at the Arnar Stadium, Ijevan, due to the rebuilding of their Dilijan City Stadium, Dilijan.
 1Shirak played at the Arnar Stadium, Ijevan, due to the rebuilding of their Gyumri City Stadium, Gyumri.

League table

Results
The league will be played in four stages. The teams will play four times with each other, twice at home and twice away, for a total of 28 matches per team.

First half of season

Second half of season

Top goalscorers
Source: ffa.am

See also
 2011 Armenian First League
 2011 Armenian Cup

References

External links
 ffa.am
 soccerway.com
 uefa.com
 rsssf.com

Armenian Premier League seasons
1
Arm
Arm